David Miner (born November 15, 1969) is an American television producer and talent manager who is known for his work as an executive producer on 30 Rock, Parks and Recreation, Brooklyn Nine-Nine, Master of None and Unbreakable Kimmy Schmidt.

Early life
Miner attended Skidmore College where in 1988 he founded the school's first improvisational comedy group and in 1990 created and produced the National College Comedy Festival, an ongoing annual event for over 25 years.  He also worked as a summer intern at The Second City in Chicago.

Career
Upon graduation, Miner returned to New York where he soon became a Producer and company member with the city's longest running improvisational theater,  Chicago City Limits. In 1995 he relocated to Los Angeles to join talent management and production firm 3 Arts Entertainment, where he rose to Partner. Miner is the manager of Tina Fey.

Awards and nominations
In addition to winning three Emmy Awards for Outstanding Comedy Series for producing 30 Rock, Miner has received 16 additional Emmy nominations as well as Golden Globe and Peabody Awards.

Filmography
Greetings from Tucson (2003)
The Tracy Morgan Show (2003–2004)
Carpoolers (2007)
Human Giant (2007–2008)
30 Rock (2006–2013)
Parks and Recreation (2009–2015)
Brooklyn Nine-Nine (2013–2021)
Mulaney (2014)
Master of None (2015–2017)
Unbreakable Kimmy Schmidt (2015–2019)
The Good Place (2016–2020)
Great News (2017–2018)
Abby's (2019)
Tacoma FD (2019–present)
Sunnyside (2019)
Never Have I Ever (TV series) (2019–present)
Mr. Mayor (2021–present)
Girls5eva (2021)
Hacks (2021)

References

External links

American television producers
Living people
Place of birth missing (living people)
1969 births
Primetime Emmy Award winners
Skidmore College alumni